F1 Exhaust Note is a two-player racing game released for arcades in 1991, modeled on Formula One racing. The game has a standard dual racing cabinet setup. Each player station has a 25-inch monitor, steering controls, shift controls, pedals, and a decorative seat. The sound originates from the back of the seat giving the player surround sound effect. The game ran on the Sega System 32 arcade hardware.

Reception 
In Japan, Game Machine listed F1 Exhaust Note on their 1 January 1992 issue as being the second most-successful upright arcade unit of the month. It went on to be the highest-grossing dedicated arcade cabinet of 1992 in Japan, and the year's second highest-grossing arcade title after Street Fighter II. In the United States, the RePlay arcade charts listed F1 Exhaust Note as the top-grossing new video game from March to April 1992.

In Play Meter magazine, Jim Overman gave the game a rating of 94% and a "gut feeling" score of 10 out of 10.

F1 Super Lap

In 1993, Sega released an FIA/FOCA licensed revision of F1 Exhaust Note titled F1 Super Lap, featuring cars from the 1992 Formula One World Championship. Other changes included an 'overtake' button, graphical improvements and the ability to link up to four cabinets for a maximum of 8 players.

Cars

Each player can select one of three cars, with the choices varying depending on the player number.

 Player 1 / 5: Williams FW14B, Lotus 107, Minardi M192
 Player 2 / 6: McLaren MP4/7A, Ligier JS37, Scuderia Italia Dallara 192
 Player 3 / 7: Benetton B192, Tyrrell 020B, Venturi Larrousse LC92
 Player 4 / 8: Ferrari F92A, Footwork FA13, Jordan 192

References

External links
 Sega Retro F1 Exhaust Note
 F1 Exhaust Note Arcade Info.
 System16 SEGA System 32; F1 Exhaust Note
 F1 Exhaust Note; Arcade-History page

Arcade video games
Arcade-only video games
Sega video games
Formula One video games
1991 video games
Video games designed by Yu Suzuki
Video games scored by Takayuki Nakamura
Video games developed in Japan